Associazione Sportiva Melfi is an Italian association football club, based in Melfi, Basilicata. The club currently play in Eccellenza Lucana.

History
The club was founded in 1929. 

Melfi has always played in amateur leagues, before being promoted to Serie C2 for the first time in 2003.

In the 2012–13 season, the club enjoyed its eleventh consecutive season in the fourth tier of Italian football, Lega Pro Seconda Divisione. The team had a decent season, finishing eighth out of 18 teams. In the 2013–14 season they won a historic promotion to the 2014–15 Lega Pro, the third tier, due to the merger of the two divisions of Lega Pro, as well as a reduction of the whole league from 69 teams to 60.

Colours and badge
The team's colours are yellow and green.

Stadium
The home ground of Melfi is the "Stadio Arturo Valerio" which has a capacity of 4,100 persons.

Honours
 1 Coppa Italia Regionale: 1992
 1 promotion in Serie C2: 2003
 4° better placing in Serie C2: 2006

Notes

External links
Official site

Football clubs in Basilicata
Melfi
Association football clubs established in 1929
Serie C clubs
1929 establishments in Italy